Paracyclotaenia strandi is a species of beetle in the family Cerambycidae, and the only species in the genus Paracyclotaenia. It was described by Stephan von Breuning in 1935.

References

Pachystolini
Beetles described in 1935